Dans la vie tout s'arrange is a 1952 French comedy film directed by Marcel Cravenne and starring Merle Oberon, Paul Henreid and Jim Gérald. It is a French-language version of the 1951 film The Lady from Boston. The screenplay concerns an American woman who arrives in a small French town where she has inherited a chateau, only to discover it is already inhabited by squatters.

Cast
 Merle Oberon - Elizabeth Rockwell
 Paul Henreid - Paul Rencourt
 Jim Gérald - Monsieur Poisson
 Maximilienne - Madame Bleubois
 Alexandre Rignault
 Paul Bonifas - Monsieur Bleubois
 Martial Rèbe - Mobet
 Lucien Callamand - L'inspector
 Marina Vlady - La petite Jacqueline
 Dora Doll - Yvette
 Víctor Merenda - François
 Laura Daryl - Mme. Mobet
 Gilberte Defoucault - Marie-Claire
 Gérard Rosset - Michel
 Albert Culloz - André
 André Aversa - Pierrot
 Nicole Monnin - Marcella

External links

1952 films
French comedy films
1950s French-language films
Films directed by Marcel Cravenne
Films set in France
French multilingual films
1950s multilingual films
1952 comedy films
French black-and-white films
1950s French films